Dobrotvir is an urban-type settlement in Chervonohrad Raion of Lviv Oblast in Ukraine. The settlement is located on the left bank of the Western Bug, which is dammed here forming Dobrotvir Reservoir. It hosts the administration of Dobrotvir settlement hromada, one of the hromadas of Ukraine. Population: 

Until 18 July 2020, Dobrotvir belonged to Kamianka-Buzka Raion. The raion was abolished in July 2020 as part of the administrative reform of Ukraine, which reduced the number of raions of Lviv Oblast to seven. The area of Kamianka-Buzka Raion was split between Chervonohrad and Lviv Raions, with Dobrotvir being transferred to Chervonohrad Raion.

Economy

Transportation
It is on the railway which connects Lviv with Kovel via Chervonohrad and Volodymyr.

The settlement has road access to Highway H17 connecting Lviv and Lutsk.

References

Urban-type settlements in Chervonohrad Raion